Genplesite is a very rare tin mineral coming from the Oktyabr'skoe deposit in the Noril'sk area, Russia, which is known for nickel and platinum group elements minerals. Its chemical formula is Ca3Sn(SO4)2(OH)6•3H2O. Genplesite is a member of the fleischerite group, and it is a calcium and tin-analogue of fleischerite. It is hexagonal, with space group P63/mmc.

References

Sulfate minerals
Tin minerals
Calcium minerals
Hexagonal minerals
Minerals in space group 194